Jatrabari KC is a Bangladeshi football club based in Jatrabari. It currently competes in the Bangladesh Championship League, the second tier of Bangladeshi football league.

History
Jatrabari KC club from Jatrabari was established on 20 October 2018. The club has ended the 2021–22 Dhaka Senior Division Football League as a runner-up and promoted to the 2022–23 Bangladesh Championship League the second tier football league of Bangladesh. Its club history first ever will play Bangladesh Championship League.

Current squad
The club management have not yet announced the squad for upcoming season.

BCL performance by year

Top goalscorers by season

Head coach records

Club management

Current technical staff
As of 27 October 2022

References

Football clubs in Bangladesh
Sport in Dhaka
Bangladesh Championship League